Transports publics Neuchâtelois ( & ) is a public transportation company in Switzerland. It manages services under the transN brand in the canton of Neuchâtel. It operates railway lines, funiculars, buses, and trolleybuses.

Railway lines 
The company owns four railway lines:

 Travers–Buttes line
 La Chaux-de-Fonds–Les Ponts-de-Martel line
 Le Locle–Les Brenets line
 Littorail, part of the Neuchâtel tramway network

It operates also three funicular lines:
 Funambule, linking the lower part of the town, near the University, to the railway station
 Ecluse–Plan
 La Coudre–Chaumont

See also 
 Trams in Neuchâtel 
 Trolleybuses in Neuchâtel

References

External links 
 

Transport in Neuchâtel
2012 establishments in Switzerland